Wadgera  is a panchayat village in the southern state of Karnataka, India. Administratively, Wadgera is under the Jevargi Taluka, Kalaburagi district, Karnataka. Wadgera is 5 km by road north of the village of Hadnoor and 64 km by road southwest of the taluka headquarters village of Jevargi.

There are four villages in the Wagera gram panchayat: Wadgera, Dumadri, Hangerga (K), and Sumbad.

Demographics
 India census, Wadgera had a population of 3,197 with 1,603 males and 1,594 females.

See also
 Kalaburagi district
 Districts of Karnataka

References

External links
 

Cities and towns in Kalaburagi district